Yurek Bogajevicz (born Jerzy Bogajewicz in Poznań, 2 June 1949) is a Polish film director, screenwriter, actor and producer. He directed, among others, Anna (1987), Three of Hearts (1993) and Exit in Red (1996).

Filmography

Director
 Anna (1987)
 Trzy serca (Three of Hearts, 1993)
 Osaczony (Exit in red, 1996)
 Boże skrawki (Edges of the Lord, 2001)
 Kasia i Tomek (TV series, 2002–2003)
 Camera Café (TV series, 2004)
 Niania (TV series, 2005–2006)
 Stacja (TV series, 2010)

Producer
 Anna (1987)

Screenplay
 Anna (1987)
 Boże skrawki (Edges of the Lord, 2001)

Actor
 Pies – as Jerzy Mazurek (1973)
 Pozwólcie nam do woli fruwać nad ogrodem – as Staszek (1974)
 Polskie drogi (1976)
 Pora na czarownice – as Passer-by on the station (1993)
 Kasia i Tomek – as Psychologist (2002-2003)

References

External links

1948 births
Living people
Polish television directors
Film people from Poznań
Polish film directors
Polish screenwriters
Polish film producers